The pale gerbil (Gerbillus perpallidus) is endemic to Egypt and is distributed mainly in the northwestern part of the country.  It is also known as the pallid gerbil. The pale gerbil has pale orange fur, with white underparts, white forelimbs and white feet. The ears are unpigmented and the soles of the feet are haired, which is a characteristic of sand-dwelling gerbils.

It averages 22 to 27 cm in length, and weights 26-49 g.

As pets
The pale or pallid gerbil, usually shortened to pallid by enthusiasts, is recommended as a good second species for those with experience of keeping Mongolian jirds (gerbils).

References

  Database entry includes a brief justification of why this species is of least concern

External links
e-Gerbil

Gerbillus
Rodents of North Africa
Endemic fauna of Egypt
Mammals described in 1958